Dr. Max Wintermark is a Swiss and American neuroradiologist (brain-imaging expert) who pioneered perfusion scanning of the brain. Wintermark is currently a Professor and the Chair of Neuroradiology at the University of Texas MD Anderson Center in Houston, Texas. Previously, he worked at Stanford and the University of Virginia in Charlottesville, VA. He trained in Lausanne, Switzerland and at the University of California, San Francisco (UCSF). Max Wintermark serves as the chair of the American Society of Neuroradiology research committee.

References

External links 

 http://www.medicine.virginia.edu/clinical/departments/radiology/medical-imaging-research/people/wintermark
 http://www.vitals.com/doctors/Dr_Max_Wintermark/video
 https://scholar.google.com/citations?user=CwIqWgIAAAAJ

See also 

 Perfusion scanning

Year of birth missing (living people)
Living people
American neuroscientists
University of Virginia people